Robert Stuart Kelsall (born 29 June 1946 in Stockport) is an English former first-class cricketer active 1969 who played for Nottinghamshire.

References

1946 births
English cricketers
Nottinghamshire cricketers
Living people
Cheshire cricketers
Sportspeople from Stockport
20th-century English people